Batchawana Bay Provincial Park is a park in Algoma District, Ontario, Canada, located  from Sault Ste. Marie on Ontario Highway 17, and on Batchawana Bay on Lake Superior. It is a day-park (no overnight camping), and is operated by the Ontario Ministry of Natural Resources. The mouth of the Carp River is at the west end of the park. The park is known for its natural, clean, sandy beach.

References

External links

Provincial parks of Ontario
Parks in Algoma District
Protected areas established in 1973
1973 establishments in Ontario